Teghut may refer to:

Teghut, Lori, Lori Province, Armenia
Teghut, Tavush, Tavush Province, Armenia
Teghut Mine, Lori Province, Armenia